This is a list of events that took place in the year 1991 in Azerbaijan.

Incumbents 
 President: Ayaz Mutallibov (starting 5 February)
 Prime Minister: Hasan Hasanov (starting 7 February)

February

March

June

August

September

October

December

References